The Line is a 16-story office building in South End Charlotte, North Carolina.  It stands at a height of 
The building will border the rail trail in South End south of the East/West Blvd Station.

The Line 
The plot of land is 2.2 acres.  It was initially put on the market March 6th, 2018 as reported by the Charlotte Observer.  Portman Holdings bought the plot for $12.7M.  Shook Kelley previously leased the  building that was there before.

Sycamore Brewing will be the anchor tenant of the building.  Sycamore co-owner Sarah Brigham said this about the project, "We are beyond excited to be a part of this amazingly cool space. With an expansive beer garden, second-story patio, house-roasted coffee offering, and a dynamic chef-driven food and beverage program, this experience is going to be second to none in the Queen City". Sycamore will feature  on 2 levels with another of space for a rooftop beer garden and outdoor area along the rail trail.  The space will also include four bars.  The expanded space will allow Sycamore to have live music in two locations on the rail trail and rooftop beer garden, a coffee shop that will also serve pastries and sandwiches, a taproom that is 5 times the size of their former taproom, and an enhanced beer selection.  In early October 2022 Sycamore Brewing closed its taproom next store to allow the new 2161 Hawkins apartment building to be built.  Their space in The Line will be opening by the end of the winter of 2023.

In May 2020 Portman Holdings secured a $95.6 million construction loan with PCCP, a real estate finance and investment management firm.  This was the fourth construction loan PCCP has extended to Portman Holdings.  PCCP was also Portman's construction lender for the building Regions 615 in Uptown Charlotte.

The building will feature  of retail and restaurant space, mostly on the first floor.  The ground floor is intended to be a gathering spot.  The location of the rail trail enhances this intent since the trail stays busy with a continuous stream of bicyclists, walkers, transit riders and visitors.  Foundry Commercial believes that both retail and office tenants of the building will benefit from the energy of the rail trail. 

Jon Dressler will be opening a new restaurant called Chapter 6 occupying  in the building.   Dressler is the owner of Rare Roots Hospitality the company's current restaurants in the Charlotte area include Dressler’s in midtown, The Porter’s House in south Charlotte, Fin & Fino in uptown, and Dogwood Southern Table in South Park.  Chapter 6 will feature Mediterranean, Morocco, and southern Spain cuisines.  Dressler expects to invest $2 million into the restaurant.  It's expected opening date is November 1, 2022.

It is an Atlanta based restaurant featuring locally grown gourmet and organic food. In addition to its indoor space the restaurant will have a  patio.

The final retail space will be occupied by Grit Box Fitness, occupying . Grit Box focuses on high intensity kickboxing and strength training.  The studio will offer 45 intensity classes.  Cody Cooper, company founder said this about the studio “We are excited to deliver a fitness experience that makes working out fun and exciting. We want everyone — beginner and advanced — to walk out of every class feeling more confident and motivated to get what they want out of life”.  The studio planned to open in the summer of 2022.

The company currently has 80 employees in the Charlotte area, 60 of which work from the office. The space will include 70 desks. Foundry is targeting a May 16, 2022 move in date, which will make them the first tenant of the building. Additional building permits for office space include Northeastern University Charlotte, Home Instead,CPA firm Frazier & Deeter, Golden Ticket and The Passage.  

in June 2022 The Line was purchased for $206 million by CBRE Investment Management of New York City.  At the time of purchase the building was less than 50% leased.  Mike McDonald, of Cushman & Wakefield who represented the seller, said this about the transaction.  "CBRE has a wealth of capital they’re trying to place in high-growth markets, and the fact that it’s less than 50% leased created a great opportunity for value-add rent, it is a really awesome and new creative office building at a drop-a-pin location in South End Charlotte. I think it's the best building in Charlotte and a top-10 building in the Southeast."

They're currently one of only a few office tenants which includes Northeastern University and Foundry Commercial. Permits showed that the company paid $7 million in late December to renovate suite 1100.

This lease brought the building's occupancy to 52%. However, the collapse of SVB puts SVB Securities lease in question. Foundry Commercial, the leasing company for the building, indicated it has no additional information about the impact on the lease.

2161 Hawkins 
Construction began in mid-October 2022 after Sycamore Brewing moved out of the building. Construction will last two years with a scheduled opening of the third quarter 2024. Apartment amenties will include concierge service, a rooftop pool, co-working spaces, a game room, climbing wall, indoor and outdoor fitness centers  The Line's lot 2.2 acre lot along with Sycamore current 1.5 acre lot were bought in 2018 by Portman Holdings for $12.7 million. The two lots will likely have a common outdoor plaza. Also a fourth floor bridge will connect the two buildings. The goal of the project is to develop a building that complements the Line.

See also
 South End
 List of tallest buildings in Charlotte, North Carolina

References

External links
 

Office buildings in Charlotte, North Carolina
Buildings and structures completed in 2022